Hans Lewy (20 October 1904 – 23 August 1988) was a Jewish American mathematician, known for his work on partial differential equations and on the theory of functions of several complex variables.

Life
Lewy was born in Breslau, Silesia, on October 20, 1904. He began his studies at the University of Göttingen in 1922, after being advised to avoid the more local University of Breslau because it was too old-fashioned, supporting himself during the Weimar hyperinflation by a side job doing railroad track maintenance. At Göttingen, he studied both mathematics and physics; his teachers there included Max Born, Richard Courant, James Franck, David Hilbert, Edmund Landau, Emmy Noether, and Alexander Ostrowski. He earned his doctorate in 1926, at which time he and his friend Kurt Otto Friedrichs both became assistants to Courant and privatdozents at Göttingen. The famous Courant-Friedrichs-Lewy condition originated from that time in 1928.

At the recommendation of Courant, Lewy was granted a Rockefeller Fellowship, which he used in 1929 to travel to Rome and study algebraic geometry with Tullio Levi-Civita and Federigo Enriques, and then in 1930 to travel to Paris, where he attended the seminar of Jacques Hadamard. After Hitler's election as chancellor in 1933, Lewy was advised by Herbert Busemann to leave Germany again. He was offered a position in Madrid, but declined it, fearing for the future there under Francisco Franco. He revisited Italy and France, but then at the invitation of the Emergency Committee in Aid of Displaced Foreign Scholars and with the assistance of Hadamard found a two-year position in America at Brown University. At the end of that term, in 1935, he moved to the University of California, Berkeley.

During World War II, Lewy obtained a pilot's license, but then worked at the Aberdeen Proving Ground. He married Helen Crosby in 1947.

In 1950, Lewy was fired from Berkeley for refusing to sign a loyalty oath. He taught at Harvard University and Stanford University in 1952 and 1953 before being reinstated by the California Supreme Court case Tolman v. Underhill.

He retired from Berkeley in 1972, and in 1973 became one of two Ordway Professors of Mathematics at the University of Minnesota. He died on August 23, 1988, in Berkeley.

Lewy is known for his contributions to partial differential equations. In 1957, his famous example of a second-order linear partial differential equation was so stunning and unexpected that the whole field steered in a new direction, as well as shaping modern analysis in a significant way. Based on this example, Louis Nirenberg, Lars Hörmander and others have outlined some important changes to the theory and structure of the field. This was adopted by many analysts and mathematicians as a major development.

He also worked on several complex variables in relation to nonlinear hyperbolic equations and elliptic equations, well-posedness for initial value problems of wave fronts (now commonly called Sobolev spaces) in the early 1930s, solutions of the classical problems of Hermann Weyl and Hermann Minkowski for analytical data (the original problem was solved by Louis Nirenberg in 1949 as part of his PhD thesis), the extendibility of minimal surfaces on and analytical nature of its boundaries which is fully free or in part, free boundary problems of water wave fronts in hydrodynamics, and the proof of quadratic reciprocity theorem in number theory from 'hydrodynamical' perspective.

Awards and honors
Lewy was elected to the National Academy of Sciences in 1964, and was also a member of the American Academy of Arts and Sciences. He became a foreign member of the Accademia dei Lincei in 1972.
He was awarded a Leroy P. Steele Prize in 1979, and a Wolf Prize in Mathematics in 1986 for his work on partial differential equations. In 1986, the University of Bonn gave him an honorary doctorate.

Publications

A selection of his work, edited by David Kinderlehrer and including his most important works, was published as the two volume work  and 
. With biographical essays by Helen Lewy and Constance Reid, and commentaries on Lewy's work by Erhard Heinz, Peter D. Lax, Jean Leray, Richard MacCamy, Louis Nirenberg and François Treves.
.
The following works are included in his "Selecta" in their original language or translated form.
. There are also two English translations of the 1928 German original paper: the first one is a translation from the German by Phyllis Fox, circulated as a research report: . The second one is a typographical improvement of the first, published by IBM as: . A freely downloadable  version of this one can be found here
.
.

See also
Lewy's example
Courant–Friedrichs–Lewy condition

References

External links
.
. An audio interview, available at eCommons@Cornell from the [Eugene B. Dynkin Collection of Mathematics Interviews Eugene B. Dynkin Collection of Mathematics Interviews ].
. The biographical entry about Hans Lewy at the Enciclopedia Treccani.

1904 births
1988 deaths
Scientists from Wrocław
20th-century American mathematicians
20th-century German mathematicians
Jewish emigrants from Nazi Germany to the United States
Complex analysts
Mathematical analysts
Rockefeller Fellows
Wolf Prize in Mathematics laureates
Fellows of the American Academy of Arts and Sciences
Members of the United States National Academy of Sciences
University of Göttingen alumni
Academic staff of the University of Göttingen
Brown University faculty
University of California, Berkeley College of Letters and Science faculty
University of Minnesota faculty